Maryland's Legislative District 7 is one of 47 districts in the state for the Maryland General Assembly. The district currently consists of parts of Baltimore County and Harford County. The district includes the communities of Bel Air North, Bel Air South, Bowleys Quarters, Edgewood, Fallston, Jarrettsville, Joppatowne, Kingsville, Middle River, Pleasant Hills, Rossville, and White Marsh. The district was established in 1975.

The district is represented by one State Senator and three State Delegates all of which serve four year terms elected during the Maryland Gubernatorial Elections.

Demographic characteristics
As of the 2020 United States census, the district had a population of 140,902, of whom 109,881 (78.0%) were of voting age. The racial makeup of the district was 107,012 (75.9%) White, 16,188 (11.5%) African American, 377 (0.3%) Native American, 5,905 (4.2%) Asian, 47 (0.0%) Pacific Islander, 2,611 (1.9%) from some other race, and 8,755 (6.2%) from two or more races. Hispanic or Latino of any race were 6,335 (4.5%) of the population.

The district had 101,882 registered voters as of October 17, 2020, of whom 19,236 (18.9%) were registered as unaffiliated, 45,777 (44.9%) were registered as Republicans, 35,311 (34.7%) were registered as Democrats, and 907 (0.9%) were registered to other parties.

Political representation
The district is represented for the 2023–2027 legislative term in the State Senate by J. B. Jennings (R) and in the House of Delegates by Kathy Szeliga (R, 7A), Ryan Nawrocki (R, 7A), and Lauren Arikan (R, 7B).

Election history

State Senate Elections Results
2014 General Election for Maryland State Senator – District 7
Voters to choose one:
{| class="wikitable"
|-
!Name
!Votes
!Percent
!Outcome
|-
|-
|J. B. Jennings, Rep.
|36,913
|  74.6%
|   Won
|-
|-
|Kim Letke
|12,502
|  25.3%
|   Lost
|-
|Other Write-Ins
|46
|  0.1%
|   Lost
|}

2010 General Election for Maryland State Senator – District 7
Voters to choose one:
{| class="wikitable"
|-
!Name
!Votes
!Percent
!Outcome
|-
|-
|J. B. Jennings, Rep.
|28,890
|  65.9%
|   Won
|-
|-
|Rebecca Weir Nelson, Dem.
|14,848
|  33.9%
|   Lost
|-
|-
|Jim  Stavropoulos, Jr. (Dem. write-in)
|53
|  0.1%
|   Lost
|-
|Other Write-Ins
|64
|  0.1%
|   Lost
|}

House of Delegates Election Results
2018 General Election for Maryland House of Delegates – District 7 
{| class="wikitable"
|-
!Name
!Votes
!Percent
!Outcome
|-
|-
|Kathy Szeliga
|38,617
|  25.4%
|   Won
|-
|-
|Lauren Arikan
|35,476
|  23.3%
|   Won
|-
|-
|Richard K. Impallaria
|34,223
|  22.5%
|   Won
|-
|-
|Allison Berkowitz
|19,550
|  12.8%
|   Lost
|-
|-
|Gordon Koerner
|15,614
|  10.3%
|   Lost
|-
|-
|Ryan Sullivan
|8,443
|  5.5%
|   Lost
|-
|Other Write-Ins
|324
|  0.2%
|   Lost
|}

2018 Republican Primary Election for Maryland House of Delegates - District 7 
Voters to choose up to three:
{|  class="wikitable"
|-
!Name 
!Votes
!Percent
!Outcome
|-
|-
|Kathy Szeliga
|7,127
|  23.3%
|   Won
|-
|-
|Richard K. Impallaria
|4,494
|  14.7%
|   Won
|-
|-
|Lauren Arikan
|4,173
|  13.6%
|   Won
|-
|-
|Aaron Penman
|3,216
|  10.5%
|   Lost
|-
|-
|Bill Paulshock
|2,869
|  9.4%
|   Lost
|-
|-
|Michael Geppi
|2,044
|  6.7%
|   Lost
|-
|-
|David Seman
|1,981
|  6.5%
|   Lost
|-
|-
|Tammy Larkin
|1,934
|  6.3%
|   Lost
|-
|-
|Joshua Barlow
|1,548
|  5.1%
|   Lost
|-
|-
|Angela Sudano-Marcellino
|498
|  1.6%
|   Lost
|-
|-
|Russ English, Jr.
|374
|  1.2%
|   Lost
|-
|-
|Norm Gifford
|219
|  0.7%
|   Lost
|-
|-
|Trevor Leach
|148
|  0.5%
|   Lost
|}

2014 General Election for Maryland House of Delegates – District 7
Voters to choose three:
{| class="wikitable"
|-
!Name
!Votes
!Percent
!Outcome
|-
|-
|Pat McDonough, Rep.
|35,627
|  26.9%
|   Won
|-
|-
|Kathy Szeliga, Rep.
|33,197
|  25.0%
|   Won
|-
|-
|Richard Impallaria, Rep.
|32,560
|  24.6%
|   Won
|-
|-
|Bob Bowle, Jr., Dem.
|11,154
|  8.4%
|   Lost
|-
|-
|Norman Gifford, Jr., Dem.
|10,192
|  7.7%
|   Lost
|-
|-
|Pete Definbaugh, Dem.
|9,707
|  7.3%
|   Lost
|-
|Other Write-Ins
|145
|  0.1%
|   Lost
|}

2014 Republican Primary Election for Maryland House of Delegates - District 7 
Voters to choose up to three:
{|  class="wikitable"
|-
!Name
!Votes
!Percent
!Outcome
|-
|-
|Pat McDonough
|6,971
|  29.0%
|   Won
|-
|-
|Kathy Szeliga
|6,125
|  25.5%
|   Won
|-
|-
|Richard K. Impallaria
|5,790
|  24.1%
|   Won
|-
|-
|David Seman
|3,483
|  14.5%
|   Lost
|-
|-
|Tina Sutherland
|1,675
|  7.0%
|   Lost
|}

2010 General Election for Maryland House of Delegates – District 7
Voters to choose three:
{| class="wikitable"
|-
!Name
!Votes
!Percent
!Outcome
|-
|-
|Richard Impallaria, Rep.
|27,217
|  23.1%
|   Won
|-
|-
|Pat McDonough, Rep.
|25,450
|  21.6%
|   Won
|-
|-
|Kathy Szeliga, Rep.
|24,573
|  20.9%
|   Won
|-
|-
|Jeff Beard, Dem.
|14,885
|  12.6%
|   Lost
|-
|-
|Kristina A. Sargent, Dem.
|13,551
|  11.5%
|   Lost
|-
|-
|James Ward Morrow, Dem.
|11,960
|  10.2%
|   Lost
|-
|Other Write-Ins
|111
|  0.1%
|   Lost
|}

2010 Republican Primary Election for Maryland House of Delegates - District 7 
Voters to choose up to three:
{|  class="wikitable"
|-
!Name
!Votes
!Percent
!Outcome
|-
|-
|Pat McDonough
|6,479
|  27.2%
|   Won
|-
|-
|Richard K. Impallaria
|5,678
|  23.8%
|   Won 
|-
|-
|Kathy Szeliga
|4,021
|  16.9%
|   Won
|-
|-
|Brian Bennett
|1,838
|  7.7%
|   Lost
|-
|-
|Marilyn Booker
|1,808
|  7.6%
|   Lost
|-
|-
|Roger Zajdel
|1,783
|  7.5%
|   Lost
|-
|-
|John Cromwell
|1,031
|  4.3%
|   Lost
|-
|-
|Jim Berndt
|873
|  3.7%
|   Lost
|-
|-
|Laine O. C. Clark
|312
|  1.3%
|   Lost
|}

2006 General Election for Maryland House of Delegates – District 7
Voters to choose up to three:
{| class="wikitable"
|-
!Name
!Votes
!Percent
!Outcome
|-
|- 
|Richard K Impallaria, Rep.
|21,333
|  18.7%
|   Won
|-
|-
|J. B. Jennings, Rep.
|21,189
|  18.6%
|   Won
|-
|-
|Pat McDonough, Rep.
|23,184
|  20.3%
|   Won
|-
|-
|Linda W. Hart, Dem.
|17,122
|  15.0%
|   Lost
|-
|-
|Jack Sturgill, Dem.
|15,390
|  13.5%
|   Lost
|-
|-
|Rebecca L. Nelson, Dem.
|13,481
|  11.8%
|   Lost
|-
|-
|Kim Fell, Green
|2,307
|  2.0%
|   Lost
|-
|Other Write-Ins
|83
|  0.1%
|   Lost
|}

2006 Republican Primary Election for House of Delegates - District 7 
Voters to choose up to three:
{|  class="wikitable"
|-
!Name
!Votes
!Percent
!Outrcome
|-
|-
|Pat McDonouogh
|4,214
|  30.1%
|   Won
|-
|-
|-
|J.B. Jennings
|3,798
|  27.1%
|   Won
|-
|Richard K. Impallaria
|3,654
|  26.1%
|   Won
|-
|-
|John T. Laing
|1,499
|  10.7%
|   Lost
|-
|-
|Nikolai Volkoff
|845
|  6.0%
|   Lost
|}

2002 General Election for Maryland House of Delegates – District 7
Voters to choose up to three:
{| class="wikitable"
|-
!Name
!Votes
!Percent
!Outcome
|-
|-
|J. B. Jennings, Rep.
|22,470
|  20.4%
|   Won
|-
|-
|Pat McDonough, Rep.
|20,869
|  18.9%
|   Won
|-
|- 
|Richard Impallaria, Rep.
|18,749
|  17.0%
|   Won
|-
|-
|Nancy M. Hubers, Dem.
|17,092
|  15.5%
|   Lost
|-
|-
|Donna M. Felling, Dem.
|14,205
|  12.9%
|   Lost
|-
|-
|Randy Cogar, Dem.
|13,926
|  12.6%
|   Lost
|-
|-
|Michael F. Linder, Libertarian
|2,817
|  2.6%
|   Lost
|-
|Other Write-Ins
|80
|  0.1%
|   Lost
|}

2002 Republican Primary Election for Maryland House of Delegates - District 7 
Voters to choose up to three:
{|  class="wikitable"
|-
!Name
!Votes
!Percent
!Outcome
|-
|-
|Pat McDonough
|3,191
|  16.9%
|   Won
|-
|-
|J.B. Jennings
|3,126
|  16.5%
|   Won
|-
|-
|Richard K. Impallaria
|2,594
|  13.7%
|   Won
|-
|-
|Sheryl L. Davis-Kohl
|2,473
|  13.1%
|   Lost
|-
|-
|Michael J. Davis
|2,079
|  11.0%
|   Lost
|-
|-
|Dilip B. Paliath
|1,883
|  10.0%
|   Lost
|-
|-
|Christopher Saffer
|1,851
|  9.8%
|   Lost
|-
|-
|Jackie Bailey
|1,708
|  9.0%
|   Lost
|}

References

Baltimore County, Maryland
Harford County, Maryland
07
07